Félix Balzer (4 April 1849 – 15 March 1929) was a French physician, specialising in dermatology and pathology.

Balzer gave an early description of pseudoxanthoma elasticum in 1884. He used the term "xanthome elastique" but subsequently it was found not to be a form of xanthomatosis. Balzer is also responsible for coining the term "adénomes sébacés" (adenoma sebaceum) to describe the papular facial rash of tuberous sclerosis. Again, this term proved to be incorrect since the papules were neither adenoma nor derived from sebaceous glands.

Between 1880 and 1887, Balzer was a director of the histology laboratory in the Faculty of the hospital Saint Louis. He became a member of the Académie de Médecine in 1908. He was also president of la Société Française de Dermatologie.

Papers

See also 
 Timeline of tuberous sclerosis

External links 
 Biography

References 

1849 births
1929 deaths
French dermatologists